Mabank High School is a public high school located in the city of Mabank, Texas, United States and classified as a 4A school by the University Interscholastic League (UIL).  It is a part of the Mabank Independent School District located in central Kaufman County.   In addition to the city of Mabank, the school serves southeast Kaufman, southwest Van Zandt, and northwest Henderson counties, including the community of Gun Barrel City and parts of Seven Points.In 2013, the school was rated "Met Standard" by the Texas Education Agency.

Athletics
The Mabank Panthers compete in these sports 

Volleyball, Cross Country, Football, Basketball, Powerlifting, Soccer, Golf, Tennis, Track, Baseball & Softball

State Titles
Boys Golf 
1988(3A)

Golf
1971-1972 Ryan Keith Hamilton won the 1A individual state Championship.

1987-1988 3A Team State Champions.

2007

Band
The Mabank Panther Band placed 7th in Class 2A at Bands of America Grand Nationals. The Mabank High School Symphonic Band, the JV band,  competed at UIL and made straight 1's in concert and sight reading. The Mabank High School Wind Symphony, the varsity band, competed at UIL and made straight 1's in concert and sight reading. The band had many people compete at the All-Region contest and had 17 students place in the All-Region band including Craig Chapman who placed 1st chair in timpani in Region 3 and Shelby Smith who advanced to the All-State band.

2009
November 9 -
Mabank Band's very own drum line, entered the Lone Star Percussion contest in Lewisville, Texas and came in fourth out of twenty other drum lines. They also won "Best tenor line." Earlier this year, the Mabank Drum Line took third in the Plano Drumline Competition.

Football 
The 2009 Mabank varsity football team won the 13-3A Bi-District championship game.

District Championships
1975 13-2A, 
1978 13-2A, 
2006 13-3A

Volleyball
During the 2007 Volleyball season, Mabank's Lady Panthers won the district 13-3A All District Volleyball team selections with a 10-0 season.

Women's Soccer
2012 Varsity Girls soccer team were the district champs. 14-4A 
District, Area, Sectional champs. and regional quarter-finalists

See also
 Mabank Independent School District
 Mabank, Texas
 Gun Barrel City, Texas
 Seven Points, Texas
 Cedar Creek Reservoir (Texas)

References

External links
 

Schools in Kaufman County, Texas
Public high schools in Texas